Unfinished Business is the second studio album by Penal Colony, released on May 12, 2003 by DSBP.

Reception
Ryan Speck of Industrial Nation praised Unfinished Business for its hooks and said the album "takes those same Penal Colony punk undertones, strips them of their dark grime, and instead creates a paranoid electronic science fiction masterpiece, dragging you for 12 tracks (plus 2 remixes) through the gutters and alleyways of D Madden's brain."

Track listing

Personnel 
Adapted from the Unfinished Business liner notes.

Penal Colony
 Dee Madden – lead vocals, instruments, production, design

Additional performers
 Joe Badger – backing vocals (10, 11)
 Grey Madden – guitar (11, 12)
 Chris Shinkus – bass guitar (8)

Production and design
 Connie Wetmore – cover art, illustrations

Release history

References

External links 
 Unfinished Business at Bandcamp
 Unfinished Business at Discogs (list of releases)

2003 albums
Penal Colony albums